This is the discography of British band Dave Dee, Dozy, Beaky, Mick & Tich.

Albums

Studio albums

Compilation albums

Video albums

EPs

Singles

Notes

References

External links
 

Discographies of British artists
Rock music group discographies
Pop music group discographies